John Edward King (born September 14, 1994) is an American professional baseball pitcher for the Texas Rangers of Major League Baseball (MLB).

Amateur career
King attended William P. Clements High School in Sugar Land, Texas. He played college baseball at Angelina College in Lufkin, Texas in 2014 and 2015. He then attended the University of Houston for two years (2016 and 2017), playing for the Cougars. He tore the UCL in his left elbow during his senior season and continued to pitch through the injury. He was drafted by the Texas Rangers in the 10th round, with the 314th overall selection, of the 2017 MLB draft, and signed with them for a $10,000 signing bonus.

Professional career
Upon signing, King underwent Tommy John surgery on July 5, 2017. He rehabbed through the majority of the 2018 season, returning that September and appearing in one game for the AZL Rangers of the Rookie-level Arizona League and in three games for the Spokane Indians of the Class A Short Season Northwest League. He was assigned to the Hickory Crawdads of the Class A South Atlantic League to open the 2019 season, and went 1–2 with a 3.42 ERA over  innings. He was promoted to the Down East Wood Ducks of the Class A-Advanced Carolina League on May 10, and went 2–4 with a 2.03 ERA over 71 innings for them.

On September 4, 2020, King’s contract was selected to the active roster and made his major league debut that day against the Seattle Mariners. In  innings for Texas in 2020, King went 1–0 with a 6.10 ERA and 9 strikeouts. Over 46 innings in 2021 for Texas, King posted a 7–5 record with a 3.52 ERA and 40 strikeouts. King was placed on the IL in July, and underwent surgery for Thoracic outlet syndrome in September 2021.

King split the 2022 season between Texas and the Round Rock Express of the Triple-A Pacific Coast League. With Texas he posted a 1–4 record with a 4.03 ERA and 30 strikeouts over  innings; with Round Rock he went 2–1 with a 7.27 ERA over  innings.

References

External links

Houston Cougars bio

1994 births
Living people
People from Laredo, Texas
Baseball players from Texas
Major League Baseball pitchers
Texas Rangers players
Angelina Roadrunners baseball players
Houston Cougars baseball players
Arizona League Rangers players
Spokane Indians players
Hickory Crawdads players
Down East Wood Ducks players
Round Rock Express players